The participation of Afghanistan in the ABU TV Song Festival has occurred six times since the inaugural ABU TV Song Festival began in 2012. Since their début in 2012, the Afghan entry has been organised by the national broadcaster Radio Television Afghanistan (RTA). In 2014, Afghanistan withdrew from the festival. Ariana Television Network (ATN) took over from organising the nation's entry since the announcement of their return to the ABU TV Song Festival 2015. In 2019, Afghanistan withdrew from the festival.

History
RTA was one of the founder members at the inaugural ABU TV Song Festivals, and have participated twice since their début in 2012. Hameed Sakhizada represented Afghanistan in 2012, with the song "Folk Music (Malestani)", performed in Persian. Afghanistan took part again in 2013 with the song "Ma Ba Tu'em (Sobh E Abadi)", performed by Shahzad Adeel.

At the ABU TV Song Festival 2014, Afghanistan was not present on the final participation list that was published, with the reasons for withdrawal never being made public. On 19 August 2015 it was announced that Afghanistan would return to the ABU TV Song Festival 2015, with a change of broadcaster, Ariana Television Network (ATN), being in charge of organising the Afghan entry. On 13 September 2015 it was announced that Mozhdah would be representing Afghanistan with the song "Hamsafar", on 20 September it was announced that Mozhdah would change her song. On 23 September it was announced that her new song would be "Ghoroore Tu, Shikaste Ma".

Participation overview 

Notes
 1.Specifically Hazaragi, a Persian dialect spoken in Hazarajat, in central Afghanistan.

References 

Countries at the ABU Song Festival